Herbert James Drury (5 January 1883 – 11 July 1936) was a British gymnast who competed in the 1908 Summer Olympics and in the 1912 Summer Olympics. As a member of the British team in 1908 he finished eighth in the team competition. He was part of the British team, which won the bronze medal in the gymnastics men's team, European system event in 1912.

References

External links
 

1883 births
1936 deaths
British male artistic gymnasts
Gymnasts at the 1908 Summer Olympics
Gymnasts at the 1912 Summer Olympics
Olympic gymnasts of Great Britain
Olympic bronze medallists for Great Britain
Olympic medalists in gymnastics
Medalists at the 1912 Summer Olympics
20th-century British people